James John Woods (May 5, 1894 – December 3, 1966) was an American football player.  A native of Jamestown, New York, he played professional football a center, tackle, and guard for the Rochester Jeffersons in the earliest years of the National Football League (NFL). He appeared in 22 NFL games between 1920 and 1924.  Prior to playing professional football, he worked as an electrical welder. After retiring from football, he lived in Salamanca, New York, and worked for Prudential Insurance Co.

References

1894 births
1966 deaths
Rochester Jeffersons players
People from Jamestown, New York
Players of American football from New York (state)